Ninia is a genus of snakes, commonly referred to as coffee snakes, in the family Colubridae of the superfamily Colubroidea. The genus consists of 10 species that are native to Mexico, Central America, and the northern part of South America. Some species are also found on the Caribbean islands.

Species
There are currently 11 recognized species:

Nota bene: A binomial authority in parentheses indicates that the species was originally described in a genus other than Ninia.

References

Further reading
Baird SF, Girard C (1853). Catalogue of North American Reptiles in the Museum of the Smithsonian Institution. Part I.—Serpents. Washington, District of Columbia: xvi + 172 pp. (Ninia, new genus, pp. 49–50).
Freiberg M (1982). Snakes of South America. Hong Kong: T.F.H. Publications. 189 pp. . (Genus Ninia, p. 104).

 
Colubrids
Snake genera
Taxa named by Spencer Fullerton Baird
Taxa named by Charles Frédéric Girard